Allah Akbar Garrison ( – Pādegān-e Allah Akbar) is a village and garrison in Howmeh-ye Jonubi Rural District, in the Central District of Eslamabad-e Gharb County, Kermanshah Province, Iran. At the 2006 census, its population was 332, in 82 families.

References 

Populated places in Eslamabad-e Gharb County
Military installations of Iran